Karin Thorborg (born 1948) is a Swedish Left Party politician. She was a member of the Riksdag from 2002 until 2006.

External links
Karin Thorborg at the Riksdag website

1948 births
21st-century Swedish women politicians
Date of birth missing (living people)
Living people
Members of the Riksdag 2002–2006
Members of the Riksdag from the Left Party (Sweden)
Women members of the Riksdag